Fabricio Bassa (born 2 August 1979 in Uruguay) is a Uruguayan football manager who last worked as director of Atlas in Mexico.

Career

Bassa started his managerial career with Sportivo Iteño. In 2015, he was appointed head coach of Club Guaraní in the Paraguayan Primera División, a position he held until 2016.

References

External links 
 Fabricio Bassa: "What project are you talking about if you get coaches to the third game" 
 "Record in dismissal of technicians" 
 Fabricio Bassa is already preparing what will be his entry into big football
 Who is Fabricio Bassa? Aboriginal DT Profile
 Fabricio Bassa: "Rafael Márquez was a fundamental piece for the arrival of reinforcements" 

1979 births
Living people
Uruguayan football managers
Uruguayan expatriate football managers
Expatriate football managers in Paraguay
Club Guaraní managers